Santiago Rodríguez may refer to:
 Santiago Rodríguez Masagó, Dominican military leader
 Santiago Rodríguez Province, province of the Dominican Republic
 Santiago Luis Polanco Rodríguez (born 1961), Dominican American former drug dealer
 Santiago Rodriguez (pianist), Cuban musician
 Santiago Rodríguez (footballer) (born 2000), Uruguayan footballer

Rodriguez, Santiago